Alfons Messerschmitt (10 June 1943 – 14 December 2022) was a German sport shooter who competed in the 1988 Summer Olympics.

References

1943 births
Living people
German male sport shooters
ISSF pistol shooters
Olympic shooters of West Germany
Shooters at the 1988 Summer Olympics
Sportspeople from Ludwigshafen